The 2001 South American U-20 Championship (Sudamericana sub-20) was a football competition contested by all ten U-20 national football teams of CONMEBOL. The tournament was held in Ecuador between January 12 and February 4, 2003, it was the 20th time the competition has been held and the 2nd to take place in Ecuador. Brazil won their 8th trophy.

The teams are separated in two groups of five, and each team plays four matches in a pure round-robin stage. The three top competitors advance to a single final group of six, wherein each team plays five matches. The top four teams in the final group qualify to the 2001 FIFA World Youth Championship.

Squads
For a list of all the players in the final tournament, see 2001 South American U-20 Championship squads.

The following teams entered the tournament:

 
 
 
 
 
  (host)

First group stage
When teams finish level of points, the final order determined according to:
 superior goal difference in all matches
 greater number of goals scored in all group matches
 better result in matches between tied teams
 drawing of lots

All match times are in local Ecuador time (UTC−05:00).

Group A

Results

Group B

Final round

Qualification to World Youth Championship
Excluding Argentina, who had qualified automatically as host, the four best performing teams qualified for the 2001 FIFA World Youth Championship.

Exclusive Rights in Television and Radio

External links
Sudamericano at the RSSSF

Youth Championship
2001 in Ecuadorian football
South American Youth Championship
International association football competitions hosted by Ecuador
2001 in youth association football